In the Tenrikyo religion, the Shinbashira (真柱 "central pillar") refers to the "administrative and spiritual leader" of Tenrikyo Church Headquarters. The Constitution of Tenrikyo defines the position as "the one who governs Tenrikyo."

The fourth and current Shinbashira is Nakayama Zenji (中山善司), who has held the office since April 26, 1998.

References

Tenrikyo